Methylomonas methanica is a Gram-negative bacterium that obtains its carbon and energy from methane, a metabolic process called methanotrophy. It is found in lakes, ponds, freshwater sediment and marshy ground. They are motile, the cells are rod-shaped.

References

External links
 Methylomonas J.P. Euzéby: List of Prokaryotic names with Standing in Nomenclature

Gammaproteobacteria
Bacteria described in 1906